Favosites is an extinct genus of tabulate coral characterized by polygonal closely packed corallites (giving it the common name "honeycomb coral"). The walls between corallites are pierced by pores known as mural pores which allowed transfer of nutrients between polyps. Favosites, like many corals, thrived in warm sunlit seas, feeding by filtering microscopic plankton with their stinging tentacles and often forming part of reef complexes. The genus had a worldwide distribution from the Late Ordovician to Late Permian.

Distribution
Favosites had a vast distribution, and its fossils can be found on every continent (except Antarctica).

Species
The following species of Favosites have been described:
 F. abnormis
 F. adaverensis
 F. afghanicus
 F. antiquus
 F. bowerbanki
 F. burkhanensis
 F. desolatus
 F. exilis
 F. fallax
 F. favosiformis
 F. favosus
 F. fusiforme
 F. goldfussi (Lecompte, 1939), from the Emsian, Eifelian and Givetian of the Holy Cross Mountains, is known to be parasitized by Chaetosalpinx.
 F. gothlandicus
 F. hisingeri
 F. ingens
 F. intricatus
 F. issensis
 F. jaaniensis
 F. kalevi
 F. lichenarioides
 F. mirandus
 F. multicarinatus
 F. oculiporoides
 F. permica
 F. petropolitana
 F. praemaximus
 F. privatus
 F. serratus
 F. sphaericus (Počta, 1902) from the lower Blue Fiord and Disappointment Bay formations of Devonian Canada.
 F. subfavosus
 F. subforbesi

Gallery

References

Tabulata
Prehistoric Anthozoa genera
Silurian animals of North America
Permian animals of North America
Carboniferous animals of North America
Devonian animals of North America
Ordovician animals of North America
Silurian animals of Asia
Permian animals of Asia
Devonian animals of Asia
Ordovician animals of Asia
Devonian animals of Africa
Devonian animals of Australia
Permian animals of Australia
Silurian animals of Australia
Devonian animals of South America
Silurian animals of South America
Silurian animals of Europe
Carboniferous animals of Europe
Devonian animals of Europe
Ordovician animals of Europe
Fossils of Georgia (U.S. state)
Fossils of Afghanistan
Silurian Argentina
Fossils of Argentina
Fossils of Australia
Fossils of Austria
Fossils of Belarus
Fossils of Belgium
Fossils of Canada
Fossils of China
Devonian Colombia
Fossils of Colombia
Fossils of the Czech Republic
Fossils of Estonia
Fossils of France
Fossils of Germany
Fossils of Greenland
Fossils of India
Fossils of Indonesia
Fossils of Iran
Fossils of Italy
Fossils of Japan
Fossils of Kazakhstan
Fossils of Kyrgyzstan
Fossils of Laos
Fossils of Lithuania
Fossils of Malaysia
Fossils of Mongolia
Fossils of Morocco
Fossils of New Zealand
Fossils of Norway
Fossils of Pakistan
Silurian Paraguay
Fossils of Paraguay
Fossils of Russia
Fossils of Saudi Arabia
Fossils of South Africa
Fossils of Spain
Fossils of Sweden
Fossils of Tajikistan
Fossils of Thailand
Fossils of Ukraine
Fossils of Great Britain
Fossils of the United States
Fossils of Uzbekistan
Fossils of Venezuela
Fossils of Vietnam
Floresta Formation
Late Ordovician first appearances
Permian genus extinctions
Jeffersonville Limestone
Paleontology in New Jersey
Paleozoic life of Ontario
Paleozoic life of British Columbia
Paleozoic life of Manitoba
Paleozoic life of New Brunswick
Paleozoic life of the Northwest Territories
Paleozoic life of Nunavut
Paleozoic life of Quebec
Paleozoic life of Yukon
Fossil taxa described in 1816